Valmore Neville Thomas (born 30 April 1958) is an English former professional footballer who played as a left back.

Career
Born in Worksop, Thomas played for Coventry City, Hereford United and Worcester City.

In 1979, he played in a benefit match for West Bromwich Albion player Len Cantello, that saw a team of white players play against a team of black players.

References

1958 births
Living people
English footballers
Coventry City F.C. players
Hereford United F.C. players
Worcester City F.C. players
English Football League players
Association football fullbacks